Minthea is a genus of tropical powderpost beetles in the family Bostrichidae. There are about eight described species in Minthea.

Species
These eight species belong to the genus Minthea:
 Minthea acanthacollis (Carter & Zeck, 1937)
 Minthea apicata Lesne, 1935
 Minthea bivestita Lesne, 1937
 Minthea humericosta Lesne, 1936
 Minthea obsita (Wollaston, 1867)
 Minthea reticulata Lesne, 1931
 Minthea rugicollis (Walker, 1858) (hairy powderpost beetle)
 Minthea squamigera Pascoe, 1866

References

Further reading

External links

 

Bostrichidae
Articles created by Qbugbot